Cyr is an unincorporated community and census-designated place (CDP) in Mineral County, Montana, United States. It is in the southeastern part of the county, in the valley of the Clark Fork. Interstate 90 crosses the community, with partial access from Exit 70.

Demographics

References 

Census-designated places in Mineral County, Montana
Census-designated places in Montana